Marco Halama (born January 2, 1997) is a Slovak professional ice hockey centre who currently plays professionally for Vlci Žilina of the Slovak 1. Liga.

Halama previously played for HC Slovan Bratislava of the Kontinental Hockey League, playing eight games during the 2016–17 season before joining HKM Zvolen later in the season. He then joined HC Bratislava of the Slovak 1. Liga in 2017 before returning to Zvolen on September 2, 2018.

Career statistics

Regular season and playoffs

International

Awards and honors

References

External links
 

1996 births
Living people
Sportspeople from Zvolen
Slovak ice hockey centres
HC Slovan Bratislava players
HKM Zvolen players
Bratislava Capitals players
HC Prešov players
HK Spišská Nová Ves players
MsHK Žilina players